DCD Publishing is a 360° literary and brand licensing agency representing a wide range of properties and talent across all media including: Television, Book Publishing, DVD, Licensed Consumer Products, Product Endorsement, Monetized Social Media and Music

The company works with all leading international book publishers and represents Universal, EMI, Chrysalis, PEER MUSIC, Carlin Sony/ATV for music publishing.

Utilizing a network of links to key retailers and manufacturers DCD is able to co-ordinate a programme of licensed consumer products that can link to both broadcast and social media activity building a complete brand identity.

DCD Publishing is led by CEO Adrian Sington, a TV tie-in publishing expert, formerly Managing Director of Boxtree, Chairman of Virgin Books and Vice-Chairman of Virgin Animation.

DCD Publishing is a division of UK independent production and distribution group DCD Media plc.

References

External links
DCD Publishing
DCD Media
DCD Rights

Book publishing companies of the United Kingdom